Roland Gräf (13 October 1934 – 11 May 2017) was a German cinematographer, film director and screenwriter. In 1982 his film "Märkische Forschungen" won the Findling Award at the National Feature Film Festival of the GDR in Karl-Marx-Stadt (Nationales Spielfilmfestival der DDR). His 1986 film The House on the River was entered into the 36th Berlin International Film Festival. Three years later, his film Fallada: The Last Chapter was entered into the 39th Berlin International Film Festival. In 1991, his film The Tango Player was entered into the 41st Berlin International Film Festival.

Selected filmography
 The House on the River (1986)
 Fallada: The Last Chapter (1988)
 The Tango Player (1991)
  (1992)

References

External links

1934 births
2017 deaths
Film people from Thuringia
People from Saalfeld-Rudolstadt
German male writers